Aostre Johnson was a professor of Education at Saint Michael's College, Colchester, Vermont.  She was formerly Director of Graduate Education, and helped establish the school's concentration in arts in education.  She was coordinator of the graduate concentrations in curriculum and elementary education, as well as the self-designed concentrations. She was also the coordinator of a Spirituality in Education Program. She taught curriculum and pedagogy courses in both the undergraduate and graduate departments. She has published articles on creativity, multiple intelligences and spirituality as they relate to human development and education.

She specialized in the study of spirituality in education.

Books
Nurturing Child and Adolescent Spirituality: Perspectives from the World's Religious Traditions (editor), Rowman & Littlefield 2005, 
Educating from the Heart: Theoretical and Practical Approaches to Transforming Education (co-author), Rowman & Littlefield Education 2011,

References

External links
spotlight interview on St. Michael's Web Site

Year of birth missing (living people)
Living people
Saint Michael's College faculty
American women non-fiction writers
American women academics
21st-century American women